The 2020 Canadian Soccer League season was the 23rd season under the Canadian Soccer League name. The season commenced on August 15, 2020, and concluded with the CSL Championship final on October 17, 2020. FC Vorkuta defeated the reigning champions Scarborough SC at Racco Park in Vaughan, Ontario, and secured their second championship. While Scarborough made their fourth consecutive appearance to the championship final and claimed their first divisional title.    

As the COVID-19 pandemic delayed the opening of the season the league ultimately released a modified shorten schedule which began in early August with the matches taking place within Toronto at Esther Shiner Stadium, and Centennial Park Stadium except for the championship final being moved to Racco Park at Concord/Thornhill Regional Park in Vaughan, Ontario.

Summary  
The events throughout the regular season resembled the previous season with the main theme being Scarborough SC and FC Vorkuta competing for the divisional and championship titles. As both teams were tied in points the title was decided on the final match of the season with Scarborough receiving their first division title by accumulating the most wins in the league's tie-breaker rules. In a bid to successfully defend their championship title the eastern Toronto side made adjustments to the roster with the acquirement of additional imports. The additions proved successful as Scarborough remain competitive and primarily battled with Vorkuta for the top spot and held the position for the final four weeks of the campaign. Their rivalry would conclude in the CSL Championship final with Vorkuta securing their second championship title. 

Vorkuta managed to retain their core veteran imports with former general manager Denys Yanchuk serving as the head coach. As a result, Vorkuta was a consistent challenger with the strongest defensive record and shifted between the first and second positions throughout the regular season. The Vaughan-based team earned their dividends in the championship final where they defeated reigning champions, Scarborough. Included in that race for the divisional title was Hamilton City SC, where the Steeltown club held the third position for the majority of the season with only a single point difference in claiming the title. Though Hamilton secured a postseason berth the organization was prevented by the league from participating after finishing in a Not-in-Good Standing state.  

The final playoff berth was secured by the Serbian White Eagles, which marked their fifteenth consecutive season of clinching a playoff berth since their return to the professional scene in 2006. The western Toronto side produced the best offensive record in the regular season but was eliminated in the first round of the championship playoffs to Vorkuta. For the second consecutive season, Brantford Galaxy concluded the season at the bottom of the standings and managed to dodge a winless season by winning their final match of the season.

Changes from 2019 
On March 29, 2020, the CSL released a tentative match schedule due to the COVID-19 pandemic. Following recommendations from health officials, the schedule was prolonged for another month with the intention of fulfilling the entire season by scheduling matches on the weekdays. On July 8, 2020, the league announced their schedule with the commencement of the league beginning in early August with seven teams returning from the previous season. All the matches were scheduled to take place at Centennial Park Stadium in Toronto, Ontario with Kingsman SC, FC Ukraine United, and SC Waterloo Region not participating for the season. The schedule was postponed for another week with the season starting on August 15, 2020. 

On June 27, 2020, the league officially released its 2020 schedule and confirmed the kickoff date for August 15, 2020, with all matches being played at Esther Shiner Stadium in August, and the remaining months at Centennial Park Stadium. Originally CSC Mississauga and SC Real Mississauga were announced as participating teams but were not included in the revised schedule.

Teams

Coaching changes

Standings

Positions by round

Playoffs 

Three teams advanced to the playoffs. Third seed Hamilton City ended the season in "Not-in-Good Standing", which resulted in their disqualification from the playoffs. The CSL Championship final was originally scheduled to take place at Centennial Park Stadium in Toronto, Ontario, but due to further provincial government restrictions regarding the COVID-19 pandemic the venue was moved to Racco Park at Concord/Thornhill Regional Park in Vaughan, Ontario.

Semifinal

Finals

Season statistics

Goals

Updated: October 5, 2020

Hat-tricks

References 
 

Canadian Soccer League (1998–present) seasons
2020 domestic association football leagues
Canadian Soccer League